Interstate 229 (I-229) is a  auxiliary Interstate Highway that runs through St. Joseph, Missouri. It begins southeast of the city at I-29 and U.S. Route 71 (US 71) and travels to the northwest into the city. In St. Joseph, it runs with US 59. Just north of an interchange with US 36, the two routes travel over a  viaduct on the banks of the Missouri River. The two routes split at the north end of the viaduct. The Interstate ends at another interchange with I-29 and US 71 north of St. Joseph.

The portion that goes through downtown St. Joseph is the second double-decked bridge in the state of Missouri, the other on I-64 in St. Louis, and one of only a few such bridges in the United States and the world.

The Interstate was built in the late 1970s and early 1980s and was intended to draw people into St. Joseph's downtown area. A portion of the historic Robidoux Row, an area of St. Joseph built by the towns founder, was demolished to make way for the viaduct along the Missouri River.

Route description
I-229 begins southeast of St. Joseph at a directional T interchange with I-29 and US 71 in rural Buchanan County. It heads to the north-northwest and almost immediately meets Route A at a half-diamond interchange; in this case, only southbound I-229 traffic can access Route A and Route A traffic can only access northbound I-229. North of the highway is a housing development while there are fields to the south. Another half-diamond interchange provides access to Route 752. Northbound I-229 traffic may exit to reach westbound Route 752. Full access to Route 752 is provided by the next exit, Route 371, known locally as 22nd Street.

As I-229 approaches downtown St. Joseph, it encounters two half-diamond interchanges. The southern interchange, for East Lake Boulevard, provides access to US 59 for northbound traffic. At the northern interchange, for South 6th Street, northbound US 59 joins northbound I-229 while southbound US 59 leaves I-229. The two routes run together northward, where they encounter US 36. Just north of US 36, the northbound I-229/US 59 lanes raise up and are positioned over the southbound lanes.

At the south end of the viaduct, another half-diamond interchange for Route 759, provides southbound traffic access to westbound US 36 as the main interchange does not provide direct access. At roughly the three-quarter point of the viaduct, two sets of exit and entrance ramps, all of which on the eastside of the structure, connect St. Joseph's central business district to the Interstate Highway.

The viaduct ends at the St. Joseph Avenue interchange, which is also where US 59 leaves I-229. After which, the highway leaves St. Joseph and enters Andrew County. The Route K interchange provides access to Amazonia. The Interstate continues north where it ends at a complex interchange with I-29 and US 71. I-29 runs from the southeast to the northwest, I-229 comes up from the south, and US 71 comes from the southeast with I-29 and exits to the north at the interchange. I-229 traffic that does not exit onto I-29 continues north on US 71.

History
I-29 initially had been designed to bypass developed areas of St. Joseph, but its construction spurred development near the Interstate on the city's eastside.

Access to St. Joseph's downtown business district earlier had been via residential streets often on a confusing maze of oneway streets.

The most dramatic and controversial section of the road is a two-level viaduct (with northbound cars on the top) on the westside of downtown, separating the town from the Missouri River. Its construction caused several historic downtown buildings to be torn down, including portions of Robidoux Row (built by the city's founder Joseph Robidoux), and hindered the view of the Missouri River from many downtown buildings.

Future 
More than 400 people gave input on 19 different design proposals through an online survey via the Missouri Department of Transportation's (MoDOT) "I-229: Moving Forward" website.

On November 14, 2019, MoDOT told the City of St. Joseph it had settled on two possible alternatives for the two-level section, both of which would involve its demolition and removing the Interstate designation. According to MoDOT's district planning manager, "Removing the structure and creating a facility that would facilitate local traffic which is what’s going on right now is the best approach moving forward." The St. Joseph Metropolitan Planning Organization's (MPO) technical committee voted down supporting the plans and asked for more information on how MoDOT arrived at its decisions.

City officials have previously discussed the possibility of tearing the viaduct down at the end of its life in 2036. Don Wichern, an area engineer for MoDOT's Northwest Region, said I-229 is the least used Interstate in Missouri. No formal plans have been forward on how to handle the traffic if it is torn down.

Exit list

References

External links

Photos of Interstate 229 (Missouri)

29-2
29-2 Missouri
2
St. Joseph, Missouri
Transportation in Buchanan County, Missouri
Transportation in Andrew County, Missouri